Richard Michael Niall  is an Australian jurist and a judge of the Court of Appeal of the Supreme Court of Victoria. He was appointed to the Court of Appeal in 2017.

Niall graduated with a Bachelor of Economics and a Bachelor of Laws with honours from the Monash University Faculty of Law in 1989. In 1995, he commenced practice as a barrister at the Victorian Bar, where he specialised in public law, revenue law, discrimination, employment and industrial law and human rights law. He was appointed senior counsel in 2010. In 2015, he was appointed Solicitor-General of Victoria. He was a member of the legal team that advised the Victorian Labor government on the cancellation of the controversial East West Link project. Niall was appointed to the Court of Appeal in 2017.

Niall is the nephew of academic, biographer and literary critic Brenda Niall AO FAHA.

References 

Living people
Year of birth missing (living people)
Judges of the Supreme Court of Victoria
Lawyers from Melbourne
Monash Law School alumni